Porcelain Palace is a large public toilet complex at the Foreigners' Street amusement park in the city of Chongqing, China.

The facade of the complex was inspired by ancient Egyptian art. A toilet complex to the south is in the distinctive style of the Spanish Catalan architect Antoni Gaudi. The complex contains a total of more than 1,000 toilets and urinals making it the largest toilet complex in the world.

The Porcelain Palace has been purged of artworks and facilities seen as vulgar by the Chinese authorities. The Love Land sex theme park attraction would have been near the Porcelain Palace and Foreigners' Street. This was due to be opened in 2009, but was demolished by the authorities before it actually opened.

References

External links
 

2007 establishments in China
Buildings and structures completed in 2007
Buildings and structures in Chongqing
Tourist attractions in Chongqing
Public toilets
Chinese porcelain
Censorship in China
World record holders